Valdemar Andersen (1889–1956) was a Danish screenwriter and film director. He worked as script manager for Nordisk Film.

Selected filmography
 De besejrede Pebersvende (1914)
 En slem Dreng (1915)
 The White Geisha (1926)

References

Bibliography 
 Jean Drum & Dale D. Drum. My Only Great Passion: The Life and Films of Carl Th. Dreyer. Scarecrow Press, 2000.

External links 
 

1889 births
1956 deaths
People from Helsingør
Danish male screenwriters
Danish film directors
20th-century screenwriters